This is a list of people from the University of Oxford in public life overseas.  Many were students at one (or more) of the colleges of the University, and others held fellowships at a college.

This list forms part of a series of lists of people associated with the University of Oxford – for other lists, please see the main article List of University of Oxford people.

Monarchs

Royal persons

Heads of State and Heads of Government

Politicians, civil servants, diplomats, and military personnel

Urszula Gacek (born 1963), British-born Polish member of the European Parliament

Non-government people in public life

Colonial administrators

Governor-Generals/Viceroys of India

See also

List of former Rhodes Scholars
List of Vice-Chancellors of the University of Oxford
List of Current Heads of Oxford University Colleges, Societies, and Halls

References

External links
British Society for the History of Mathematics: Oxford individuals
Famous Oxford Alumni
Short Alumni List Published by Oxford

 Public Life Overseas